Dykeman is a historic Dutch surname.  It may also apply to:

 Dykeman Point, a point on southwest Alexander Island, Antarctica
 Dykeman Waldron Baily, a businessman and author
 Dykeman's Spring, a historic fish farm located at Shippensburg in Cumberland County, Pennsylvania
 Dykeman's station, a former station on the Harlem Line of the New York Central Railroad
 Dykemans, New York, a historic neighborhood in the town of Southeast

See also
 Dyckman (disambiguation)
 Dykman